, is a third-person puzzle-action video game developed by Namco Bandai Games for iOS. It is a continuation of the Katamari Damacy series of games. In 2010 Namco announced a Windows Phone 7 version of the game. A version was released for Android in 2012 exclusively for Samsung Android devices. In this game, the King of All Cosmos instructs the game's protagonist – the Prince – to gather as many objects as possible to grow a highly adhesive ball called a Katamari large enough so that he can pick up special objects to bring to the King so that he can regain his memory.

The gameplay is identical to that of Katamari Damacy, where the player rolls a highly adhesive ball called a Katamari, collecting various objects of increasing size until it becomes large enough to transform into a star. The game utilizes the specialized technology from the iPhone and iPod Touch in which players tilt the device to move the Katamari across the playing field. I Love Katamari received mixed reviews. While it has been praised for its game presentation, it has also been criticized for performance and control issues. The performance and control issues were improved in an update, but not entirely fixed. As of 2018 the game has been delisted from the Apple App Store and Google Play Store, though it is not available on the Windows Store, the page for it is still active.

Gameplay

In I Love Katamari, the player controls a highly–adhesive ball called the katamari. The object is to make the katamari as large as possible by running over and collecting objects of increasing size. The more objects players collect, the larger the katamari becomes. One reviewer described the game as follows: "Basically, the object is to roll a ball around a level and pick up as much junk as you can to make the ball bigger. It sounds EPIC, and it’s fun to play and really addicting". Instead of using analog controllers to control the katamari as in the home console Katamari games, players roll the katamari by tilting the iPhone/iPod Touch in the direction they want the katamari to go. The goal is to collect specific objects requested by the King of All Cosmos within a specified time limit.

Reception

I Love Katamari has received some praise and some criticism from various reviewers. While some reviewers, such as Nicole Lee from CNET, praised the game for its intuitive usage of the iPhone/iPod Touch technology, other reviewers such as Luke Plunkett from Kotaku and Levi Buchanan from IGN have heavily criticized the game for its lack of responsiveness in controls and handling of the katamari as well as software lag that could cause the game to freeze.Namco Bandai released an update for the game, improving some performance and control problems previously experienced by users.

References

External links
Windows Store

Katamari
2008 video games
IOS games
Windows Phone games
Video games developed in Japan
Namco games
Puzzle video games
Android (operating system) games